The Guayana pike-conger (Cynoponticus savanna, also known as the Pike-headed eel or the Sapphire eel) is an eel in the family Muraenesocidae (pike congers). It was described by Edward Nathaniel Bancroft in 1831, originally under the genus Conger. It is a marine, tropical eel which is known from the western Atlantic Ocean, including Central America, the Caribbean and Brazil.

The Guayana pike-conger's diet consists of zoobenthos. It is of minor commercial use to fisheries, and is marketed fresh.

References

Muraenesocidae
Fish described in 1831